Santa Rita may refer to:

Rita of Cascia (1381–1457), Catholic saint
Associação Atlética Santa Rita, a Brazilian football (soccer) club
Santa Rita de Cássia FC, an Angolan football (soccer) club

Places

Belize
Santa Rita, Corozal, a Maya ruin and archaeological reserve

Bolivia
Santa Rita (El Torno)

Brazil

Santa Rita, Maranhão, a town in Maranhão state
Santa Rita, Paraíba, a town in Paraíba state
Santa Rita de Cássia, a town in Bahia
Santa Rita de Cássia dos Coqueiros or Cássia dos Coqueiros, a village in São Paulo state
Santa Rita do Araguaia, Goiás
Santa Rita do Novo Destino, Goiás
Santa Rita do Trivelato, Mato Grosso
Santa Rita do Pardo, Mato Grosso do Sul
Santa Rita de Caldas, Minas Gerais
Santa Rita de Ibitipoca, Minas Gerais
Santa Rita de Jacutinga, Minas Gerais
Santa Rita de Minas, Minas Gerais
Santa Rita do Itueto, Minas Gerais
Santa Rita do Sapucaí, Minas Gerais
Santa Rita d'Oeste, São Paulo
Santa Rita do Passa Quatro, São Paulo
Santa Rita do Tocantins, Tocantins

Colombia
Santa Rita, Vichada, a town and municipality in the Vichada Department

El Salvador
Santa Rita, Chalatenango

Guam
Santa Rita, Guam

Honduras
Santa Rita, Copán
Santa Rita, Santa Bárbara
Santa Rita, Yoro

Mexico

Santa Rita Tlahuapan, a municipality of Puebla

Panama
Santa Rita, Coclé
Santa Rita, Panamá Oeste

Paraguay
Santa Rita, Paraguay
Santa Rita District, Paraguay

Peru
Santa Rita de Siguas District, Arequipa

Philippines
Santa Rita, Pampanga
Santa Rita, Samar

Puerto Rico
Santa Rita (Hato Rey), a sector of Hato Rey

United States
Santa Rita, California (disambiguation), multiple locations
Santa Rita, Montana
Santa Rita, New Mexico, a ghost town
Santa Rita, Texas, a ghost town
Santa Rita Jail, Dublin, Alameda County, California
Santa Rita Mountains, Arizona

Venezuela
Santa Rita, Aragua
Santa Rita, Zulia, Zulia

Other uses
Santa Rita, Cremona, an ancient Roman Catholic church in Cremona, Italy
SS Santa Rita (1941), a cargo ship